Jean Derouet (31 January 1866 – 14 March 1914) was a French Roman Catholic missionary bishop. He was one of the Congregation of the Holy Ghost and of the Immaculate Heart of Mary, and titular Bishop of Camachus. He was born at Saint-Denis-de-Villenette, Diocese of Séez, Orne, France. Ordained in 1891, he went as missionary to the Congo, and in 1904 was named pro-Vicar Apostolic of Loango (now the Archdiocese of Pointe-Noire). He was chosen bishop on 19 December 1906; consecrated 3 February 1907, in the chapel of the Holy Ghost, at Paris; preconized on 18 April of the same year; and appointed Vicar Apostolic of Lower French Congo.

References

External links
Catholic Hierarchy 

1866 births
1914 deaths
20th-century Roman Catholic bishops in the Republic of the Congo
20th-century French Roman Catholic bishops
Roman Catholic titular bishops
Roman Catholic bishops of Pointe-Noire